Deal Island Historic District is a national historic district at Deal Island, Somerset County, Maryland, United States. The district encompasses the village of Deal Island. It includes Deal Island Harbor, still an active marina for fishing boats and an occasional skipjack.  The  district contains 81 buildings and three cemeteries that contribute to its significance.

It was added to the National Register of Historic Places in 2006.

References

External links
, including photo from 2004, at Maryland Historical Trust
Boundary Map of the Deal Island Historic District, Somerset County, at Maryland Historical Trust

Historic districts in Somerset County, Maryland
Historic districts on the National Register of Historic Places in Maryland
National Register of Historic Places in Somerset County, Maryland